Avondale railway station may refer to:

 Avondale railway station, Auckland, on the Western Line of the Auckland railway network in New Zealand
 Avondale railway station, Queensland, a closed railway station on the North Coast railway
 Avondale station (MARTA), a train station in Decatur, Georgia, United States